Andrey Gennadyevich Makeyev (3 February 1952 – 13 September 2021) was a Soviet basketball player who competed for the Soviet Union in the 1976 Summer Olympics and won a bronze medal.

References

External links
 

1952 births
2021 deaths
Russian men's basketball players
Soviet men's basketball players
Olympic basketball players of the Soviet Union
Basketball players at the 1976 Summer Olympics
Olympic bronze medalists for the Soviet Union
Olympic medalists in basketball
People from Petrozavodsk
Medalists at the 1976 Summer Olympics
BC Spartak Saint Petersburg players
Sportspeople from the Republic of Karelia